In the United States, a presidential commission is a special task force ordained by the president to complete a specific, special investigation or research. They are often quasi-judicial in nature; that is, they include public or in-camera hearings.

List of presidential commissions

 First Philippine Commission – "Schurman Commission" (1899)
 Second Philippine Commission – "Taft Commission" (1900)
 Commission on the Organization of Government Scientific Work (1903)
 Committee on Department Methods – "Keep Commission" (1905–1909)
 President's Commission on Economy and Efficiency (1910–1912)
 President's Committee on Economic Security (1934) 
 President's Commission on Administrative Management – "Brownlow Committee" (1937)
 Commission to Investigate the Japanese Attack on Pearl Harbor – a.k.a. "Roberts Commission" (1941)
 President's Committee on Civil Rights (1946)
 President's Scientific Research Board (1946)
 Presidential Commission on Higher Education (1947)
 Commission on Organization of the Executive Branch of the Government – Hoover Commission (1947)
 President's Committee on Equality of Treatment and Opportunity in the Armed Services – a.k.a. "Fahy Committee" (1948)
 President’s Committee on Religious & Moral Welfare & Character Guidance in the Armed Forces (1948)
 President's Water Resources Policy Commission (1950)
 President's Communications Policy Board (1950)
 President's Commission on Migratory Labor (1950)
 President's Commission on Internal Security and Individual Rights (1951)
 President's Commission on the Health Needs of the Nation (1951)
 President's Commission on Immigration and Naturalization (1952)
 Commission on Intergovernmental Relations – a.k.a. "Kestenbaum Commission" (1953)
 President's Railroad Commission (1960)
 Presidential Commission on the Status of Women (1961)
 Trade and Environment Policy Advisory Committee (1962)
 The President's Commission on the Assassination of President Kennedy – a.k.a. "Warren Commission" (1963)
 President's Review Committee for Development Planning in Alaska (1964)
 President's Commission on Crime in the District of Columbia (1965–1969)
 President's Commission on Law Enforcement and Administration of Justice (1965–1969)
 President's Committee for People with Intellectual Disabilities (1966; formerly The President's Committee on Mental Retardation, 1963)
 National Advisory Commission on Civil Disorders – a.k.a. the "Kerner Commission" (1967–1968)
 President's Commission on Budget Concepts (1967–1969)
 National Commission on the Causes and Prevention of Violence (1969)
 President's Blue Ribbon Defense Panel (1969–1970) (urged 60% cuts in Pentagon staffs)
 President's Commission on Campus Unrest (1970)
 President's Commission on Financial Structure and Regulation – a.k.a. the "Hunt Commission" (1970–1971)
 National Commission on Fire Prevention and Control (1971)
 President's Commission on Olympic Sports (1975)
 National Commission on the Observance of International Women's Year (1975)
 U.S. President's Commission on CIA activities within the United States – a.k.a. Rockefeller Commission (1975)
 President's Advisory Board on International Investment (1977)
 Presidential Advisory Board on Ambassadorial Appointments (1977)
 President's Commission on Mental Health (1977)
 President's Commission on Military Compensation (1977)
 President's Commission on Foreign Language and International Studies (1978)
 President's Commission on the Coal Industry (1978)
 President's Commission on Pension Policy (1978)
 Presidential Commission on World Hunger (1978)
 President's Commission on the Holocaust (1978)
 President's Commission on the Accident at Three Mile Island (1979)
 President's Advisory Committee for Women (1979)
 President's Commission for a National Agenda for the Eighties (1979)
 President's Commission for the Study of Ethical Problems in Medicine & Biomedical & Behavioral Research (1979)
 Advisory Committee on Small and Minority Business Ownership (1980)
 President's Commission on United States–Liberian Relations (1980)
 President's Committee on the International Labor Organization (1980)
 President's Committee on Small Business Policy (1981)
 President's Council on Spinal Cord Injury (1981)
 President's Commission on Hostage Compensation (1981)
 President's Private Sector Survey on Cost Control – a.k.a. "Grace Commission" (1982)
 President’s Commission for the Study of Ethical Problems in Medicine and Biomedical and Behavioral Research (1982)
 National Commission on Excellence in Education (1983)
 Presidential Commission on the Space Shuttle Challenger Accident – a.k.a. "Rogers Commission" (1986)
 President's Special Review Board (Iran-Contra) – a.k.a. "Tower Commission" (1986)
 President's Commission on Organized Crime (1986)
 President's Blue Ribbon Commission on Defense Management – a.k.a. "Packard Commission" (1986)
 President's Commission on the HIV Epidemic (1987)
 President's Advisory Commission on Educational Excellence for Hispanics (1990)
 Good Neighbor Environmental Board (1992)
 President's commission on aviation security and terrorism (1990)
 National Industrial Security Program Policy Advisory Committee (1993)
 National Space-Based Positioning, Navigation, and Timing Advisory Board (1995; recharted 2004) AKA:PDD-39
 Presidential Advisory Council on HIV/AIDS (1995)
 President's Commission on Veterans Education  (1996)
 Presidential Advisory Commission on Holocaust Assets in the United States (1998)
 Invasive Species Advisory Committee (1999)
 Advisory Board on Radiation and Worker Health (2000)
 Marine Protected Areas Federal Advisory Committee (2000)
 President's Commission To Strengthen Social Security (2001)
 President's Commission on Excellence in Special Education (2001)
 Commission on the Future of the United States Aerospace Industry (2001)
 National Infrastructure Advisory Council (2001)
 National Commission on Terrorist Attacks Upon the United States – a.k.a. 9/11 Commission (2002)
 President's Commission on the United States Postal Service (2002)
 Commerce Spectrum Management Advisory Committee (2004)
 President's Commission on Implementation of United States Space Exploration Policy (2004)
 Commission on the Intelligence Capabilities of the United States Regarding Weapons of Mass Destruction (2005)
 State, Local, Tribal, and Private Sector (SLTPS) Policy Advisory Committee (2009)
 National Commission on Fiscal Responsibility and Reform (2010)
 Blue Ribbon Commission on America's Nuclear Future (2010)
 Interagency Task Force on Veterans Small Business Development (2010)
 National Commission on the BP Deepwater Horizon Oil Spill and Offshore Drilling (2010)
 President's Council of Advisors on Science and Technology (Orig, 2001; recharted 2010)
 President's Council on Fitness, Sports, and Nutrition (Orig. 1944 National Committee on Physical Fitness; recharted 2010)
 President's Advisory Commission on Educational Excellence for African Americans (2012)
 San Juan Islands National Monument Advisory Committee (2013)
 Presidential Advisory Council on Combating Antibiotic-Resistant Bacteria (2014)
 President's Advisory Council on Doing Business in Africa (2014)
 Bears Ears National Monument Advisory Committee (2016)
 Commission on Enhancing National Cybersecurity (2016)
 Gold Butte National Monument Advisory Committee (2016)
 Governmental Advisory Committee to the United States Representative to the North American Commission for Environmental Cooperation (2016)
 National Advisory Committee to the United States Representative to the North American Commission for Environmental Cooperation (2016)
 President’s Commission on Combating Drug Addiction and the Opioid Crisis (2017)
 Presidential Advisory Commission on Election Integrity (2017)
 President's Board of Advisors on Historically Black Colleges and Universities (2017)
 Presidential Commission on the Supreme Court of the United States (2021)

See also
 Presidential task force
 Royal Commission
 Blue-ribbon panel

References

Further reading
 Donna Batten, et al.  Encyclopedia of Governmental Advisory Organizations (Detroit, MI: Gale, 1973–  . annual editions).
 Kenneth Kitts, Presidential Commissions and National Security: The Politics of Damage Control (Boulder: Lynne Rienner, 2006).
 Steven D. Zink, Guide to the Presidential Advisory Commissions, 1973–1987 (Alexandria, VA: Chadwyck-Healey, Inc, 1987).

 
 
Presidency of the United States
Commission
Commission